

List of ambassadors

Alon Roth-Snir, 2018–present
Raphael Schutz, 2014–2018
Naim Araidi, 2012–2014
Michael Eligal, 2009–2012
Miryam Shomrat, 2005–2008
Liora Herzl, 2001–2005
Amos Nadai, 1997–2001
Joel Alon, 1990–1994
Yudith Hiebner, 1983–1987
Gad Elron, 1981–1983
Hava Hareli, 1978–1981
David Rivlin, 1975–1978
Avigdor Dagan, 1969–1972
Nathan Bar-Yaacov, 1963–1969
Avner Gershon, 1962–1963
Ambassador Reuven Barkat, 1960–1962
Minister Chaim Yahil (Non-Resident, Stockholm), 1956–1959 
Minister Avraham Nissan (Non-Resident, Stockholm), 1950–1956

References

Norway
Israel